The Lura Formation is a geological formation in western China, which outcrops in Tibet, whose strata date back to the Early Cretaceous. Dinosaur remains are among the fossils that have been recovered from the formation.

Vertebrate paleofauna
 Tetanurae indet. 
 ?Coelurosauria indet. 
 Sauropoda indet. (=cf. Asiatosaurus kwangshiensis) 
 Monkonosaurus lawulacus? - "[Two] vertebrae, sacrum with illia, [three] plates, adult. (possibly found instead in the overlying Loe-ein Formation)"

See also 

 List of dinosaur-bearing rock formations

References 

Geologic formations of China
Lower Cretaceous Series of Asia
Cretaceous China
Paleontology in Tibet